Francesca Velicu is a Romanian ballet dancer. She is a junior soloist at the English National Ballet. In 2018, she won the Laurence Olivier Award for Outstanding Achievement in Dance.

Early life
Velicu was born in Bucharest, Romania. She trained at Choreography High School Floria Capsali in Bucharest and The Bolshoi Ballet Academy in Moscow.

Career
In 2015, at age 17, Velicu joined the Romanian National Ballet, which was directed by Johan Kobborg. Kobborg cast her in soloist roles immediately. She also met Alina Cojocaru, Kobborg's partner and Velicu's idol. However, in 2016, Kobbarg and Cojocaru resigned from the company after the new leadership's actions. After that, Cojocaru suggested Velicu to audition for the English National Ballet, where Cojocaru is a lead principal dancer. After Velicu auditioned in Paris, Tamara Rojo, the company's artistic director, offered Velicu a contract to join the company as an Artist. She moved to London within a week.

In 2017, she danced The Chosen One in Pina Bausch's Le Sacre du printemps, and was praised by critics. The Guardian noted, "her performance has the power and stagecraft of an adult but the sobbing terror of a child." Later that year, she was promoted to First Artist. In 2018, at age 19, she won the Laurence Olivier Award for Outstanding Achievement in Dance for Le Sacre du printemps. She reprised the role in 2019. She had also danced Clara/Sugar Plum Fairy in The Nutcracker.

Selected repertoire

Clara/Sugar Plum Fairy, Chinese and Spanish in The Nutcracker
Odalisque in Le Corsaire
Pas de Trois in Swan Lake
Princess Florine in Sleeping Beauty

Third principal couple in No Man's Land
The Chosen One in Le Sacre du printemps
Kitri in Don Quixote
The first couple in Theme and Variations

References

Romanian ballerinas
English National Ballet dancers
Entertainers from Bucharest
Living people
1990s births
Moscow State Academy of Choreography alumni
Laurence Olivier Award winners
21st-century ballet dancers
Romanian expatriates in Russia
Romanian expatriates in England